S. candida  may refer to:
 Salix candida, the sageleaf willow, a shrub species found in northern United States and Canada
 Sidalcea candida, the white checkermallow or white checkerbloom, a wildflower species found from Nevada to Wyoming and south to the southern part of New Mexico
 Stanhopea candida, an orchid species endemic to southern tropical America
 Sternbergia candida, a flowering plant species in the genus Sternbergia

See also
 Candida (disambiguation)